"It Means Nothing" is a song by Welsh rock band Stereophonics from their sixth studio album, Pull the Pin (2007). The ballad was released as a single on 24 September 2007 and reached number 12 on the UK Singles Chart. B-side "Helter Skelter" is a cover version of the original song by the Beatles.

Background and meaning
Lead singer and guitarist Kelly Jones wrote "It Means Nothing" about the 7 July 2005 London bombings shortly after the event; it was one of the first songs composed for Pull the Pin. A midtempo ballad, the song is a retrospective account on the bombings with theological overtones, with lyrics such as "You can find yourself a god / Believe in which one you want / 'Cause they love you all the same / They just go by different names."

Track listings
UK CD single
 "It Means Nothing" – 3:48
 "Bank Holiday Monday" – 3:14
 "Helter Skelter" – 4:19
 "Hangman" (demo) – 2:46

UK 7-inch single 1
A. "It Means Nothing"
B. "Bank Holiday Monday"

UK 7-inch single 2
A. "It Means Nothing" (live)
B. "Bank Holiday Monday" (live)

Credits and personnel
Credits are taken from the first UK 7-inch single sleeve and the Pull the Pin booklet.

Studios
 Recorded at Grouse Lodge (County Westmeath, Ireland), Real World Studios (Wiltshire, England), and Eden Studios (London, England)
 Mixed at South Lane Studios (England)
 Mastered at Sterling Sound

Personnel

 Kelly Jones – writing, vocals, guitars, production
 Richard Jones – bass
 Javier Weyler – drums
 Jim Lowe – production, engineering

 Mike "Spike" Stent – mixing
 Ted Jensen – mastering
 Miles Aldridge – cover photography

Charts

References

2000s ballads
2005 songs
2007 singles
Songs critical of religion
Songs written by Kelly Jones
Stereophonics songs
V2 Records singles